The Valdostan Union (UV), also Valdostian Union or Valdotanian Union is a regionalist and centrist political party in Aosta Valley, Italy. It represents mainly the Arpitan-speaking minority in the region. One of its leading members, Renzo Testolin, has been the President of Aosta Valley since March 2023, replacing Erik Lavévaz, also of the UV.

The UV has been steadily represented in the Italian Parliament since 1976 and, due to the disappearance of the Christian Democracy party in the early 1990s, it later became the catch-all party of the region, similarly to the South Tyrolean People's Party in South Tyrol. The party re-group most Valdostanb autonomists under its banner and steadily increased its share of vote from the 11.6% of 1973 to the 47.2% of 2003, then it started a decline and was riven by splits. However, it has led the regional government almost with no interruption since 1974.

History

Early years
The UV was founded by Valdostan elements of the Italian resistance movement on 3 September 1945.

The party was originally a close ally of the Christian Democracy (DC), with which it shared government between 1946 and 1954 under Severino Caveri (UV). After that, the party distanced itself from the DC, while approaching the left-wing.

After a five-year spell in opposition, the UV won the 1959 regional election as part of a left-wing coalition with the Italian Communist Party (PCI) and the Italian Socialist Party (PSI) with 51.6% against the 48.6% received by an alternative coalition comprising the DC, the Italian Liberal Party (PLI), the Italian Democratic Socialist Party (PSDI) and the Italian Republican Party (PRI).

The UV–PCI–PSI coalition, led by UV's Oreste Marcoz (1959–1963) and then, again, Caveri (since 1963), governed until 1966, when the Socialists decided to switch sides and to enter in coalition with the DC, as they had done at the country-level three years before. This caused the split of UV's conservative faction, which established the Valdostan Rally (RV), in order to support the coalition led by DC's Cesare Bondaz. In the 1968 regional election the UV received a mere 16.7% of the vote (the RV got 5.4%), while in 1973 Valdostan regional election, after the split of the social-democratic faction, the Progressive Valdostan Union (UVP), it was reduced at 11.6% (the UPV obtained 6.7% and the RV 1.6%, while the Popular Democrats, a left-wing split of the DC, won 22.4%). After that low point, the UV was ready to surge again.

Resurgence
The UV returned to government in 1974 at the head of a UV–UVP–RV regionalist coalition led by Mario Andrione. In the 1978 regional election the UV returned to be the largest party with 24.7% of the vote and Andrione formed a government with the DC and the DP. In 1984 Andrione was replaced by Augusto Rollandin at the head of the government, which included the DC and the Progressive Democratic Autonomists (ADP), born by the merger of the DP and the UVP. During the 1980s the UV strengthened its role as largest party in the region: 27.1% in 1983 and 34.2% in 1988. Since the 1970s the UV was steadily represented in the Italian Parliament: Pierre Fosson was a member of the Senate from 1976 to 1987, while Luciano Caveri (scion of the party's left-wing) represented the UV in the Chamber of Deputies from 1987 to 2001. Caveri served also as undersecretary in Massimo D'Alema's government and as member of the European Parliament from 2000 to 2003.

After having out of government for three years, the UV was back in government in 1992 and, after the 1993 regional election, UV's Dino Viérin formed a centre-left government with the Democratic Party of the Left (PDS), the Greens and the ADP (since 1994). The coalition was continued in 1998–2006 by the UV and the Democrats of the Left (DS), while Rollandin served as senator in 2001–2006. Despite its ties with the parties of the centre-left, the UV contested the 2006 general election in competition with The Union (rallied in the Autonomy Liberty Democracy list), as part of the regionalist coalition named Aosta Valley, causing the split of the Valdostan Renewal (RV), but lost and was no more represented in Parliament. This was however a turning point in regional politics: the UV dismissed the DS as coalition partners and formed a regionalist three-party coalition with Edelweiss (SA) and the Autonomist Federation (FA).

Regionalist coalition
In the 2008 regional election the UV obtained 44.4% of the vote and 17 regional councillors (out of 35), while the regionalist coalition won 62.0% and a large majority, comprising 22 regional councillors. Augusto Rollandin, who had made a comeback to regional politics, was the most voted regional councillor with 13,836 preference votes, while incumbent President Luciano Caveri was only seventh with 2,770 votes (down from 7,313). Rollandin was thus sworn in as new President of the Region. Contextually, UV's Antonio Fosson had been elected to the Senate for the regionalist coalition: Fosson joined the For the Autonomies group and abstained from the vote of confidence on Silvio Berlusconi's government. Both in the 2009 European Parliament election and the 2010 Aosta municipal election the UV formed an alliance with Berlusconi's new political party, The People of Freedom (PdL). In the 2013 general election UV's Albert Lanièce was elected to the Senate with support from the PdL. That alliance was however short-lived and the UV would soon re-join its traditional centre-left partners.

In the 2013 regional election the UV, which had suffered the split of the new Progressive Valdostan Union (UVP), obtained 33.5% of the vote (–10.9pp from 2008) and 13 seats, and the regionalist coalition retained a narrow majority in the Regional Council. Rollandin was the most voted politician with 10,872 preference votes (2,964 less than five years before) and was re-elected president. In July 2015 the government was enlarged to the centre-left Democratic Party (PD). In June 2016, after months of negotiations, the government was joined also by the UVP.  In November 2016 two regional councillors, including former senator Fosson, left the party in disagreement with Rollandin and launched For Our Valley (PNV). In March 2017 the UVP, SA (which had suffered the split of the Valdostan Autonomist Popular Edelweiss (EPAV), PNV and Autonomy Liberty Participation Ecology (ALPE) formed a new government without the UV, under President Pierluigi Marquis (SA). In October Marquis resigned and was replaced by Laurent Viérin (UVP) at the head of a coalition composed of the UV, the UVP, the EPAV and the PD.

Centre-left coalition
In the 2018 general election, Lanièce was narrowly re-elected to the Senate, but the four-party coalition forming the regional government lost several votes and the seat in the Chamber. In the 2018 regional election the UV did even worse, obtaining 19.2% of the vote (–14.3pp from 2013) and seven seats: its worst result in 45 years. After the election, the Regional Council elected Nicoletta Spelgatti of Lega Nord Vallée d'Aoste (LNVdA) as President, at the head of a broad left-right coalition (including one defector from UV's ranks, outgoing regional minister Emily Rini), and the UV was once again excluded from the regional government. However, in December the government fell down and was replaced by a new one led by Antonio Fosson (ex UV, then PNV), at the head of a coalition composed of the UV, the UVP, ALPE, SA and PNV. In December 2019 Fosson resigned from President and was replaced by his Vice President, UV's Renzo Testolin, as acting president. In the 2019 European Parliament election the UV was part of a five-party regionalist joint list, which had a technical agreement with the PD and obtained a mere 13.9% of the vote. A few months later, the party also suffered the split by former President Rollandin and his followers, who formed For the Autonomy (PlA).

In the 2020 regional election, the UV was reduced to 15.8%, its second worst result ever, while the LNVdA came a stronger first. However, after the election, UV leader Erik Lavévaz formed a government composed of the PD, Civic Network (RC), the Valdostan Alliance (AV, formed by the merger of ALPE and UVP), SA and Mouv'. Within a year, AV and Mouv' joined forces, while the RC-led Progressive Civic Project (PCP) left the government. In 2023 Testolin formed a new government, which, differently from Lavévaz's, comprised also PlA.

Electoral results

Regional Council

Leadership
President: Severino Caveri (1945–1974), Mario Andrione (1974–1975), Jean-Claude Perrin (1975–1984), Alexis Bétemps (1984–1996), Carlo Perrin (1996–1998), Augusto Rollandin (1998–2001), Aurelio Marguerettaz (2001–2003), Manuela Zublena (2003–2006), Guido Césal (2006–2008), Ego Perron (2008–2013), Ennio Pastoret (2013–2018), Erik Lavévaz (2018–2021), Cristina Machet (2021–present)

References

Sources
Regional Council of Aosta Valley – History of Aosta Valley
Regional Government of Aosta Valley – Governments since 1946
Regional Government of Aosta Valley – Elections
Cattaneo Institute – Archive of Election Data
Parties and Elections in Europe – Aosta Valley
Ministry of the Interior – Historical Archive of Elections

External links
Official website

Political parties in Aosta Valley
1945 establishments in Italy
Political parties of minorities
Political parties established in 1945
Christian democratic parties in Italy
Catholic political parties